Alexandru "Alec" Secăreanu (born 4 December 1984) is a Romanian actor. He gained international recognition for playing Gheorghe in the 2017 film God's Own Country.

Early life
Alexandru Secăreanu was born in Bucharest. He completed drama study at the Caragiale Academy of Theatrical Arts and Cinematography in 2007.

Career
After appearing in a number of Romanian films, Secăreanu appeared in his first English-language role in director Francis Lee's God's Own Country (2017), in which he played a Romanian migrant worker Gheorghe, who begins a relationship with a sheep farmer played by British actor Josh O'Connor on a farm in rural West Yorkshire. Lee had insisted on casting a Romanian actor in the role of Gheorghe. After winning the role, he worked on a farm for two weeks before filming. His performance in God's Own Country earned him a London agent, membership of Equity (formerly officially titled the British Actors' Equity Association), and a nomination for 2017 British Independent Film Awards (BIFA) in Best Actor category.

Personal life
As of 2017, Secăreanu lives in Bucharest.

Filmography

Film

Television

Stage

Accolades

References

External links
 
 
 profile at castforward.de (German)
 Primul film britanic îi aduce un agent londonez lui Alec Secăreanu – Interview with Evantia Barca at eranews.ro, 6 July 2016 (Romanian)
 profile at teatrul.ro (Romanian)

1984 births
21st-century Romanian male actors
Caragiale National University of Theatre and Film alumni
Living people
Male actors from Bucharest
Romanian male film actors
Romanian male stage actors
Romanian male television actors